Saint Joseph Preparatory High School, formerly the Mount Saint Joseph Academy, is a Catholic, college-preparatory high school founded in 2012 in Brighton, Boston, Massachusetts. This followed the 2012 closings of Mount Saint Joseph Academy and Trinity Catholic High School. The school occupies Mount Saint Joseph Academy's former campus, and both institutions were named in honor of Saint Joseph.

In February 2023, the school announced it would close the end of the academic year.

Notable alumni 
Maura Hennigan, former Boston City Councilor
 Frances Sweeney (1908-1944), anti-fascist activist and journalist

References

External links
 

Brighton, Boston
Catholic secondary schools in Massachusetts
High schools in Boston
Roman Catholic Archdiocese of Boston
Sisters of Saint Joseph schools